Wimbledon High School is an independent girls' day school in Wimbledon, South West London. It is a Girls' Day School Trust school and is a member of the Girls' Schools Association.

History
Wimbledon High School was founded by the Girls' Public Day School Trust (now known as the Girls' Day School Trust or GDST). It opened on 9 November 1880 at No. 74 (now No. 78) Wimbledon Hill Road with 12 students and Miss Edith Hastings as Headmistress, aged just 29. Over the next decade, the school roll grew to over 200 girls. The first lesson taught was on the subject of the apple. Soon after, the fruit was used as the emblem of the school. Every year on the school's birthday in November, pupils and staff eat apple-green cakes in memory of this.

Ethel Gavin became the head in 1908. During World War I, the school endured a difficult time, the head was in Germany at the time and was detained for some weeks. The timetable was suspended for older students as girls and teachers joined the war effort and made respirators for the troops. A fire broke out in 1917 and gutted the main building. The head, Ethel Gavin, who organised the recovery died in early 1918 from cancer. The girls were moved to a temporary location to resume their activities.

The new building was formally opened by old girl, the Duchess of Atholl, in October 1920 and included a gymnasium and two new laboratories. The facilities have now been much expanded upon. The school's sports fields, at Nursery Road (off Worple Road) were until 1923 the site of the All England Club, before it moved to its present location in Church Road.

The school was greatly affected by the Second World War. Pupil numbers fell as London was bombarded during the Battle of Britain. Under the Education Act 1944, the school applied for and was granted "direct grant" status. It chose to become private when the scheme was abolished during the 1970s.

A new junior school building was opened in 2000. New buildings were added such as a design and technology centre, new science labs and the Rutherford Centre for the Performing Arts, named after the actress Margaret Rutherford, an alumna of the school.

In 2019 a building project began, known as Project Ex-Humilibus, from the school motto. The plans include the development of a STEAM tower, a new sixth-form centre, and a relocation of the dining room.

Wimbledon High School has an eating disorder problem.

Houses
Originally there was no house system, but now girls are placed in one of the four houses upon entry. There are inter-house competitions and activities held throughout the year notably: The Big Draw, House Music, Junior Drama, Inter-house sports, Sports Day, Off-Timetable Day, House University Challenge, and House Debating.

Junior School
The junior houses were named after famous women.

Senior School
The houses were named after four of the twelve first students to attend Wimbledon High School: May and Margaret Arnold, Mildred Hastings, Violet Scott-Moncrieff and Sophie Meredith. Each house has its own house committee consisting of a house captain and deputy house captain chosen by staff after an application process, and then Music, Art, Sports and Drama captains and a secretary selected by the house captain. House points are awarded for victory in house competitions and also by teachers in recognition for academic excellence and good conduct, following the PBS system.

Headmistresses

 Miss Edith Hastings (1880–1908)
 Miss Ethel Gavin (1908–1918)
 Miss Mabel Lewis (1918–1939)
 Miss Kathleen Littlewood (1940–1949)
 Miss Marguerite Burke (1949–1962)
 Mrs Anne Piper (1962–1982)
 Mrs Rosemary Smith (1982–1992)
 Mrs Elizabeth Baker (1992–1995)
 Dr Jill Clough (1995–2000)
 Mrs Pamela Wilkes (2001–2008)
 Mrs Heather Hanbury (2008–2014)
 Mrs Jane Lunnon (2014–2020)
 Ms Fionnuala Kennedy (2020–present)

Associated People

Notable former pupils

Katharine Stewart-Murray, Duchess of Atholl (1874–1960)
Sylvia Payne (1880–1976) – psychoanalyst
Dame Margaret Rutherford "Peggy" (1892–1972) – actress
Judith Ledeboer (1901–1990) – architect
Dame Mary Smieton (born 1902) – civil servant and Secretary to the Ministry of Education
Sheila May Edmonds (1916–2002) – Mathematician and Lecturer at University of Cambridge
Jean Aitchison (born 1938) – Professor Emeritus of Language and Communication, University of Oxford
Professor Dame Louise Johnson (1940–2012) – biochemist and crystallographer
Ilora Finlay, Baroness Finlay of Llandaff (born 1949)
Bridget Rosewell OBE (born 1951) – economist
Sara Nathan OBE (born 1956) – broadcast journalist & regulator
Sasha Wass KC (born 1958) – barrister
Michelle Paver (born 1960) – author famous for Chronicles of Ancient Darkness 
Rosie Millard (born 1965) – journalist & broadcaster
Samira Ahmed (born 1968) – news presenter
Lara Croft (born 1968) – fictional video games character, heroine of the Tomb Raider series
Afua Hirsch (born 1981) – writer & broadcaster
Lizzy Pattinson (born 1983) – singer
Amara Karan (born 1984) – actress (St Trinians)
Georgina Sherrington (born 1985) – actress (The Worst Witch); winner of Young Artist Award for Best Performance in a TV Comedy Series
Monica Allanach (died 2013) – actuary

Notable former teachers

 Nellie Dale was a teacher at Wimbledon who created her own basic reading program that used phonological awareness and phonics. 
 Ethel Gavin head here during WW1
 Ada Wallas the socialist writer taught here briefly.

References

External links
 School Website

Private schools in the London Borough of Merton
Schools of the Girls' Day School Trust
Private girls' schools in London
Educational institutions established in 1880
Member schools of the Girls' Schools Association
1880 establishments in England
Buildings and structures in Wimbledon, London